The Lovers (VI) is the sixth trump or Major Arcana card in most traditional Tarot decks. It is used in game playing as well as in divination.

Interpretation

According to A.E. Waite's 1910 book Pictorial Key to the Tarot, the Lovers card carries several divinatory associations:

6. THE LOVERS.—Attraction, love, beauty, trials overcome. Reversed: Failure, foolish designs. Another account speaks of marriage frustrated and contrarieties of all kinds.

In some traditions, the Lovers represent relationships and choices. Its appearance in a spread indicates some decision about an existing relationship, a temptation of the heart, or a choice of potential partners. Often an aspect of the Querent's life will have to be sacrificed; a bachelor(ette)'s lifestyle may be sacrificed and a relationship gained (or vice versa), or one potential partner may be chosen while another is turned down. Whatever the choice, it should not be made lightly, as the ramifications will be lasting.

The Lovers is associated with the star sign Gemini, and indeed is also known as The Twins in some decks. Other associations are with Air, Mercury, and the Hebrew letter ז (Zayin).

In the Rider Waite deck, the imagery for this card is changed significantly from the traditional depiction. Instead of a couple receiving a blessing from a noble or cleric, the Rider–Waite deck depicts Adam and Eve in the Garden of Eden. By reducing the number of human beings depicted in the card from three to two, Waite was able to reinforce its correspondence with Gemini. The Rider–Waite card also includes the Tree of the knowledge of good and evil with a serpent wrapped around its trunk. The symbolism of no return from making bad decisions, and the consequences of innocence lost, would be more widely understood from this imagery.

In popular culture

 In the 1973 film Live and Let Die (film), the character Solitaire repeatedly finds this card (card deck designed by Fergus Hall) and interprets that she is destined to be in love with James Bond.
JoJo's Bizarre Adventure: Stardust Crusaders uses Tarot cards to name character's Stands. One of the Stand's name is Steely Dan's The Lovers, which is named after The Lovers card.

References

External links

 The symbolism of The Lovers - how to interpret this card

Major Arcana